Eilean dà Mhèinn, is a small inhabited island in Loch Crinan and one of the Inner Hebrides of Scotland.

Although apparently not permanently inhabited in 2001 according to the 2011 census  there was a single inhabitant at that time. It has a landing stage on the eastern shore and a building  near the centre of the island.
The crowded harbour at Crinan has so many moorings that "it is no longer possible to anchor to the south or east" of the island.

Eilean dà Mhèinn is part of the Knapdale National Scenic Area, one of 40 in Scotland.

Notes

References
 

Islands of Argyll and Bute